Jean-Aniel Eclesiaste Assi (born 12 August 2004) is a professional soccer player who plays as a winger for Atlético Ottawa of the Canadian Premier League, on loan from CF Montréal in Major League Soccer. Born in the Ivory Coast, Assi represents Canada internationally.

Early life

Born in Adzopé, Ivory Coast, in 2004, Assi moved to Canada at age 10. He began playing youth soccer in Canada with ASM LaSalle, before joining Royal-Sélect de Beauport. In 2017, he joined the Montreal Impact Academy. In 2020, he took part in the pre-season training camp with the first team, when he was only fifteen.

Club career 
On 4 December 2020, Assi signed his first homegrown contract with Montreal Impact (later renamed CF Montréal for the 2021 season). Assi made his professional debut with Montreal Impact in a 1-0 CONCACAF Champions League win over C.D. Olimpia on 15 December 2020, becoming the youngest ever player to play for the club at the age of 16 years and 125 days.

In March 2022, Assi went on a one-year loan with Canadian Premier League side Cavalry FC. In February 2023, he went on loan with Atlético Ottawa.

International career
, Assi is eligible to represent both the Ivory Coast and Canada. In July 2019, he made his debut in the Canadian youth program at a U15 camp. He represented the Canada U15s at the 2019 CONCACAF Boys' Under-15 Championship, where he was named to the Tournament All-Star XI. In June 2022, he was named to the Canadian U-20 team for the 2022 CONCACAF U-20 Championship.

Career statistics

Notes

References

External links
 
 CF Montreal Profile
 

2004 births
Living people
People from Adzopé
Soccer players from Montreal
Canadian soccer players
Canada men's youth international soccer players
Ivorian footballers
Ivorian emigrants to Canada
Association football wingers
Royal-Sélect de Beauport players
Homegrown Players (MLS)
CF Montréal players
Cavalry FC players
Canadian Premier League players
Atlético Ottawa players